The Islamic Front for Liberation of Oromia (abbreviated IFLO) was an Oromo-based political and paramilitary organization founded in 1985 by its Commander in Chief, Sheikh Abdulkarim Ibrahim Hamid, otherwise known as Jaarraa Abbaa Gadaa.

The group was politically and militarily based in eastern Ethiopia, controlling portions of the countryside in the eastern highlands and around Jijiga by the time Mengistu Haile Mariam fled the country in Spring 1991. They then joined the Transitional Government of Ethiopia (TGE) where the party held 3 seats out of the 27 reserved for Oromo parties. The Oromo Liberation Front (OLF) held 12, while the Oromo People's Democratic Organization held the remaining 10.

Conflicts 
Apart from its armed insurgency against the Derg which was overthrown in 1991, the IFLO later engaged in armed clashes with other dominant parties in what was the TGE, namely the Tigrayan People's Liberation Front (TPLF). The clashes were sparked by alleged TPLF/EPRDF acts of sabotage and aggression towards the organization. This began immediately following the overthrow of Mengistu Haile Mariam. Some examples include:

On January 18, 1992, two leaders of the IFLO, Sheikh Abdel Rahman Yusuf and Izzeldin Mohamed Ahmed, were killed by the EPRDF in Dire Dawa. Five others were wounded. The EPRDF claimed that the IFLO leaders failed to halt their car at a roadblock and opened fire on the EPRDF guards; the IFLO claims that the incident was a planned ambush, and pointed to the killing of another of its leaders, Faisal Birru, and the wounding of others, in the previous months by the EPRDF.

The home of Ato Mehammed Chello in Addis Ababa was converted into a prison for three days, from September 25 through 27 1993. A group of armed persons belonging to EPRDF occupied the home, alleging that Ato Mehammed has hidden certain individuals they were looking for and demanding to know their whereabouts. Ato Mehammed and three other men were tied tightly with ropes and beaten in front of their family members. The rope with which their hands were tied and the beating has caused severe damage to their bodies.

Ato Mehammed Chello was a member of the Central Committee of IFLO and once a member of the Council of Representatives of the TGE.

Tesfaye Deressa and Bekele Mekonnen of Urji newspaper were charged in December 1995 with "publishing false information and disseminating it internationally" in connection with their report of a military communique by the OLF and IFLO.

After withdrawing from the TGE and boycotting the 1995 general elections, the group returned to the bush with the objective of toppling the EPRDF, and has since claimed responsibility for many operations launched against EPRDF targets.

In a 1994 interview with an Arabic-language paper made available by An-Najah Blogs, Sheikh Abdulkarim claimed that the mujahideen controlled 24,000 km2, predominantly in the East Hararghe Zone, and were carrying out commando operations against EPRDF targets.

Links and References 
Fidohome.org 
Osar.ch
Isic-centre.org
Dosfan.lib.uic.edu 

Google search
Blogs.najah.edu

References

1985 establishments in Ethiopia
Ethnic political parties in Ethiopia
Factions of the Ethiopian Civil War
Guerrilla organizations
History of Ethiopia
National liberation movements in Africa
Political parties established in 1985
Political parties in Ethiopia
Rebel groups in Ethiopia
Separatism in Ethiopia